Dave FM may refer to:

 CJDV-FM, a radio station in Kitchener, Ontario, Canada
 WZGC, a radio station in Atlanta, Georgia, United States
 KKDT, a radio station in Burdett, Kansas, United States
KITS, a radio station in San Francisco, California, United States